The Department of Energy, Environment and Climate Action (DEECA) is a government department in Victoria, Australia. It is responsible for various matters related to the environment, energy and climate change.

The department was renamed from the Department of Environment, Land, Water and Planning on 1 January 2023. It was created in the aftermath of the 2022 state election, with Premier Daniel Andrews announcing that several portfolios would be changing. Responsibilities such as urban planning were ceded to the new Department of Transport and Planning, while other responsibilities from other agencies such as agriculture, resources and energy programs were transferred from the Department of Jobs, Precincts and Regions to the DEECA.

Ministers
, the DEECA supports four ministers in the following portfolio areas:

Responsibilities
DEECA will have responsibility for the following policy areas:
 Environment
 Energy
 Wildlife
 Heritage
 Climate change
 Waste and resource recovery
 Mining and resources
 Agriculture
 Marine and coasts
 Water and catchments
 Forest Fire Management Victoria (an agency for Bush firefighting)
 Reestablishment of the State Electricity Commission of Victoria

References

External links 
Department of Energy, Environment and Climate Action

Environment of Victoria (Australia)
Environment
Government agencies established in 2023
2023 establishments in Australia
Victoria